130 Colmore Row  is a Grade II listed building in the city centre of Birmingham, England. The building was built in 1903 as the main office for Alliance Assurance by architecture firm Goddard & Co. of Leicester. The building served as an office and banking hall for Alliance Assurance until the 1990s when it was bought by Birmingham City Council and became a tourist information office and later a careers centre. In 2013 the building was sold to a Chinese Investment Consortium who have planned to turn the vacant building into a restaurant named 'Nosh and Quaff'

Nosh & Quaff
The restaurant Nosh and Quaff opened in July 2015 after a £1 million internal fit out by Keane Design Associates. The restaurant is run by Aktar Islam's Lasan Group and specialises in lobster and beer.

References

Grade II listed buildings in Birmingham
Buildings and structures completed in 1903